Albizia elegans is a species of plants. It is found in Myanmar.

See also
 List of Albizia species

References

External links
 Albizia elegans at The Plant List
 Albizia elegans at Tropicos

elegans
Plants described in 1875
Flora of Myanmar